Chaetostoma stroumpoulos is a species of catfish in the family Loricariidae. It is native to South America, where it occurs in the Huallaga River basin in Peru. The species was described alongside the species Chaetostoma daidalmatos in 2006 by Norma J. Salcedo of the College of Charleston on the basis of distinctive morphology and coloration.

References 

stroumpoulos
Fish described in 2006